Karel Geraerts (born 5 January 1982) is a Belgian former footballer and current head coach of Union SG.

Career
Geraerts played for Club Brugge from 1998 to December 2003. In 2004 Club Brugge lent him to Lokeren where he scored his first goal in the Jupiler League. In the summer of 2004 he moved to Standard Liège. In June 2007 he went back to Bruges. As a youngster the midfielder played with C.S. Mechelen-aan-de-Maas and Racing Genk (from 1996 to 1998) before he moved to the youth team of Club Brugge. After the 2010–11 season, Geraerts was no longer part of the plans at Club Brugge and was told he could look for a new club, which resulted in him signing with newly promoted side Oud-Heverlee Leuven on the last day of the transfer period. Geraerts' contract ended in 2014 and with Oud-Heverlee Leuven just being relegated, it was not renewed. This allowed him to move as a free agent player to Charleroi. He last played for Charleroi in 2016 and after being without a club for half a year has announced his retirement in January 2017.

In 2005, Geraerts debuted for the Belgium national football team. In his first match in the starting line-up, on 12 October in and against Lithuania in a World Cup qualifier, he scored the opening goal.

International goals

|- bgcolor=#DFE7F2
| 1. || 12 October 2005 || Žalgiris Stadium, Vilnius, Lithuania ||  || 0–1 || 1–1 || 2006 FIFA World Cup qualification
|- bgcolor=#DFE7F2
| 2. || 20 May 2006 || Štadión Antona Malatinského, Trnava, Slovakia ||  || 1–1 || 1–1 || Friendly
|- bgcolor=#DFE7F2
| 3. || 12 September 2007 || Almaty Central Stadium, Almaty, Kazakhstan ||  || 0–1 || 2–2 || UEFA Euro 2008 qualification
|- bgcolor=#DFE7F2
| 4. || 17 October 2007 || Stade Roi Baudouin, Brussels, Belgium ||  || 3–0 || 3–0 || UEFA Euro 2008 qualification
|}

Honours
Club Brugge
Belgian Super Cup: 2002

References

 
 

1982 births
Living people
Belgian footballers
K.R.C. Genk players
K.S.C. Lokeren Oost-Vlaanderen players
Standard Liège players
Club Brugge KV players
Oud-Heverlee Leuven players
R. Charleroi S.C. players
Belgium international footballers
Belgian Pro League players
Sportspeople from Genk
Footballers from Limburg (Belgium)
Association football midfielders
Belgian football managers
Belgian Pro League managers
Royale Union Saint-Gilloise managers